Pisti Q'asa (Aymara and Quechua pisti influenca, a common cold or plague, Quechua q'asa mountain pass, Hispanicized spelling Pistijasa) is a  mountain in the Wansu mountain range in the Andes of Peru. It is located in the Arequipa Region, La Unión Province, Huaynacotas District. Pisti Q'asa lies southwest of Puka Urqu and northwest of P'umpu Q'asa.

References 

Mountains of Peru
Mountains of Arequipa Region